These are the complete results of the finals of swimming events at the inaugural 1951 Mediterranean Games which took place between 5 and 20 October in Alexandria, Egypt.

Only seven events were contested, open to male swimmers only.

Results

100 m freestyle

400 m freestyle

1500 m freestyle

100 m backstroke

200 m breaststroke

4 × 200 m freestyle relay

3 × 100 m medley relay

References

External links
Complete 1951 Mediterranean Games Standings

Mediterranean Games